Walter Andreas Jakobsson (6 February 1882 – 10 June 1957) was a Finnish figure skater, and the oldest figure skating Olympic champion (at age 38). As a single skater, he won the Finnish national championship in 1910 and 1911. In 1910, he partnered with German figure skater Ludowika Eilers. As pairs skaters, they won the World Championship in 1911, 1914, and 1923, and the Olympic gold in 1920. They finished second at the 1924 Olympics and fifth in 1928.

Jakobsson studied engineering in Berlin, where he met Eilers in 1907. They married in 1911, and in 1916 moved to Helsinki, where Jakobsson got a job of the technical director of Kone OY (now Konecranes), a leading manufacturers of cranes. He held that post until retiring in 1947. He was also an amateur photographer and member of the Fotografiamatörklubben i Helsingfors (Helsinki Amateur photography Club). His specialty was dark city scenes with special light effects like rain or mist.

Results

Pairs with Ludowika Jakobsson-Eilers

Men's singles

References

1882 births
1957 deaths
Finnish pair skaters
Olympic figure skaters of Finland
Figure skaters at the 1920 Summer Olympics
Figure skaters at the 1924 Winter Olympics
Figure skaters at the 1928 Winter Olympics
Sportspeople from Helsinki
Olympic gold medalists for Finland
Olympic silver medalists for Finland
Olympic medalists in figure skating
World Figure Skating Championships medalists
Medalists at the 1924 Winter Olympics
Medalists at the 1920 Summer Olympics